Puerto Rico Highway 158 (PR-158) is a proposed connector to be located east of downtown Cayey, Puerto Rico. When completed, it will extend from PR-52 to PR-1.

Major intersections

See also

 List of highways numbered 158

References

External links
 

158
Cayey, Puerto Rico